Bernard "Ben" Denzil Whiteman (born 20 August 1954) is a Curaçaoan politician who served as the 5th Prime Minister of Curaçao from September 2015 to December 2016. Whiteman was sworn in as Prime Minister on 1 September 2015. He also was the Minister of Public Health, Environment and Nature since 31 December 2012 in the Asjes-Cabinet and the Hodge-Cabinet before taking the post, retaining the position after becoming prime minister.

Prime Minister
Whiteman took on the post of Prime Minister with the intent of staying in office for three months, to allow his party to search for a successor. On 29 October 2015, it was announced Whiteman would stay on until the 2016 elections. The Whiteman Cabinet resigned on 9 November 2015 after losing the parliamentary majority when Marilyn Moses withdrew her support. One week later, Whiteman announced he had formed a new coalition, with the entry of the Party for the Restructured Antilles (PAR) into the coalition. The PAR held two seats in the Estates and was allowed to designate the new Minister for the Economy. The new cabinet began to function on 30 November 2015.

A fourth report on the functioning of the Curaçaohuis, the office of the Minister Plenipotentiary of Curaçao, Marvelyne Wiels, was highly critical. The report, and the fact that it had yet not been shared with the Estates of Curaçao, led coalition parties in the Second Whiteman cabinet to voice severe criticism in July 2016. Alex Rosaria, leader of the Partido pa Adelanto I Inovashon Soshal, called the issue "a dark cloud over the Whiteman cabinet". The leader of the PAR, Zita Jesus-Leito, asked for the voluntary resignation or Wiels or else her dismissal by Whiteman.

Whiteman's successor as Prime Minister, Hensley Koeiman, was sworn in on 23 December 2016.

Second Whiteman cabinet

Source:

References

1954 births
Living people
Prime Ministers of Curaçao
Environment ministers of Curaçao
Health ministers of Curaçao
Public health ministers
Curaçao politicians
Sovereign People politicians